This is a list of Korean animated films, sorted by year, in South korea and North korea(NK); they are in Korean  language only.

List of korean animated films by decade

1960s
 A Story of Hong Gil Dong / 풍운아 홍길동 (1967)
 Hopy and Chadol Bawi / 호피와 차돌바위 (1967)
 Heungbu and Nolbu / 흥부와 놀부 (1967)
 Hwanggeum Cheolin / 황금철인 (1968)
 Sonokong / 손오공 (1968)
 Black Star and Golden Bat / 검은 별과 황금박쥐 (1968)
 General Hong Gil Dong / 홍길동 장군 (1969)
 Treasure Island / 보물섬 (1969)

1970s
 Taekwon Dongja Maruchi and Arachi / 태권동자 마루치 아라치 (1976)
Robot Taekwon V / 로보트 태권브이 (1976)
 Jeonja Ingan 337 / 전자인간337 (1977)
General Ttoli / 똘이장군 (1978) - South Korea's first anti-communist animated film. Since this animated film became popular with Korean children, numerous anti-communist animated films have been produced in South Korea. However, the film is also criticized for its explicit portrayal of violence and political messages.
 Ujusonyeon Kaesi / 우주소년 캐시 (1979)

1980s
 Adventure of Headol / 해돌이 대모험 (1982)
 Uju Jeonsa Hong Gil-dong / 우주전사 홍길동 (1983)
 My Name is Dokgo Tak / 내 이름은 독고탁 (1984)

The 2000s
 My Beautiful Girl, Mari / 마리이야기 (2002)
 Oseam / 오세암 (2003)
 Sky Blue (film) / 원더풀 데이즈 (2003)
Aachi & Ssipak / 아치와 씨팍 (2006)
Yobi, The Five-Tailed Fox / 천년여우 여우비 (2007)

The 2010s

 The King of Pigs / 돼지의 왕 (2011)
 Leafie, A Hen into the Wild / 마당을 나온 암탉 (2011)
 Green Days: Dinosaur and I / 소중한 날의 꿈 (2012)
 Swimming to Sea / 파닥파닥 (2012)
The Satellite Girl and Milk Cow / 우리별 일호와 얼룩소 (2014)
Timing / 타이밍 (2015)
Lost in the Moonlight / 달빛궁궐 (2016)
Ghost Messenger /  고스트 메신저 (2014)
 Seoul Station / 서울역 (2016)
 The Haunted House: The Secret of the Cave / 신비아파트: 금빛 도깨비와 비밀의 동굴 (2018)
 Underdog / 언더독 (2018)
Bad Boss / 나쁜 상사 (2018)
 The Haunted House: The Sky Goblin VS Jormungandr / 극장판 신비아파트: 하늘도깨비 대 요르문간드 (2019)

The 2020s
 Beauty Water / 기기괴괴 - 성형수 (2020)
Stress Zero / 스트레스 제로 (2020)
Your Letter / 연의 편지 (2022) (Naver, LICO)
The Haunted House: The Dimensional Goblin and the Seven Worlds / 신비아파트 극장판 차원도깨비와 7개의 세계 (2022)
Yumi's Cells / 유미의 세포들 (2023) (Naver, SIDUS)

See also
 South Korean animation
 North Korean animation
 Manhwa
 History of Korean animation

References

Animated
Korean